Sarmiento is a surname meaning vine shoot in Spanish. Notable people with the name include:

Arts
Basilio L. Sarmiento, Filipino poet
Eduardo Sarmiento, Cuban-American artist
Eugenia Belin Sarmiento, Argentine painter and author
Félix Rubén García Sarmiento, known as Rubén Darío, Nicaraguan poet
Marcel Sarmiento, American film director
Pablo Sarmiento, known as Babalu, Filipino comedian
Saulo Sarmiento, Spanish acrobat
Valeria Sarmiento, Chilean film director
Wenceslaus Sarmiento, American architect

Church
Diego Sarmiento Valladares, Spanish bishop
José Sarmiento, Argentine priest
Martín Sarmiento, Galician Enlightenment priest
Pedro Sarmiento (cardinal), Spanish bishop and cardinal

Journalism
Abraham Sarmiento Jr., Filipino journalist
Carmen Sarmiento, Spanish journalist and TV presenter
Filadelfo Sánchez Sarmiento, Mexican radio journalist
Judith Sarmiento (born 1954), Colombian lawyer and journalist

Politics
Alfonso Sarmiento, Colombian lawyer and politician
Angelito Sarmiento, Filipino politician
Domingo Faustino Sarmiento, President of Argentina
Edgar Mary Sarmiento, Filipino politician
José Sarmiento de Valladares, 1st Duke of Atrisco, Viceroy of New Spain
Juana de J. Sarmiento (1899-1979), Colombian politician, activist
Mel Senen Sarmiento, Filipino politician

Public Service
Abraham Sarmiento, Filipino jurist
Diego Sarmiento de Acuña, 1st Count of Gondomar, Spanish diplomat
Lina Sarmiento, Director of the Philippine National Police
María José Sarmiento, Argentine judge

Science
Esteban Sarmiento, Primatologist and biologist
Raúl Chávez Sarmiento, Peruvian mathematician

Sport
Andrés Sarmiento, Colombian footballer
Antonio Sarmiento, Spanish footballer
Aarón Sarmiento, Spanish sailor
Brian Sarmiento, Argentine footballer
Cayetano Sarmiento, Spanish road bicycle racer
Daniel Sarmiento, Argentine boxer
Darío Sarmiento, Argentine footballer 
Ismael Sarmiento (born 1973), Colombian road cyclist
Jeremy Sarmiento, Ecuadorian footballer
Jorge Sarmiento, Peruvian football forward
Luis Sarmiento, Cuban wrestler
Manny Sarmiento, Venezuelan baseball pitcher
Marcelo Sarmiento, Argentine footballer
Mauro Sarmiento, Italian martial artist
Pedro Sarmiento (footballer), Colombian football manager
Raymond Sarmiento, American tennis player

Others
Luis Carlos Sarmiento, Colombian billionaire
Pedro Sarmiento de Gamboa, Spanish explorer

See also
 Sarmiento (disambiguation)

References

Spanish-language surnames